The Way the Wind Blows is the third studio album by A Hawk and a Hacksaw, released in 2006 on The Leaf Label.

Track listing
 "In the River"
 "The Way the Wind Blows"
 "Song for Joseph"
 "Fernando's Giampari"
 "God Bless the Ottoman Empire"
 "Waltz for Strings and Tuba"
 "Oporto"
 "Gadje Sirba"
 "The Sparrow"
 "Salt Water"
 "There Is a River in Galisteo"

Personnel
Jeremy Barnes – Accordion, Piano, Percussion, Vocals
Heather Trost – Violin, Viola
Ariel Muniz – Cello
Dan Clucas – Cornet
Constantin 'Sulo' Calin – Euphonium
Joseph Garcia – Oud
Daniel Ivancea – Alto Saxophone
Costica 'Cimai' Trifan – Trumpet
Zach Condon – Trumpet ("In the River", "Fernando's Giampari")
Constantin 'Pinca' Cantea – Tuba
Mark Weaver – Tuba
Additional Vocals by Griffin Rodriguez, Ian Scroggins, James Duddy, Joseph Williams, Matthew Taylor, Otto Barthel, Robbie Mueller
Artwork by Laurie Latham

External sources
Leaf Label site

2006 albums
A Hawk and a Hacksaw albums
The Leaf Label albums